1st Politburo may refer to:
1st Central Bureau of the Chinese Communist Party
1st Politburo of the Communist Party of Cuba, 1975–1980
1st Politburo of the Party of Labour of Albania
1st Politburo of the Communist Party of Czechoslovakia
1st Politburo of the Socialist Unity Party of Germany, 1946–1947
1st Politburo of the Polish United Workers' Party, 1948–1954
1st Politburo of the Romanian Communist Party, 1921–1922
1st Politburo of the Lao People's Revolutionary Party, 1955–1972
1st Standing Committee of the Indochinese Communist Party, 1935–1951
1st Politburo of the Communist Party of Yugoslavia, 1919–1920
1st Politburo of the Hungarian Communist Party, 1919–1930
1st Political Committee of the Workers' Party of North Korea, 1946–1948
1st Political Committee of the Workers' Party of South Korea, 1946–1949